... Beautiful Lies You Could Live In was the sixth album credited to American psychedelic folk group Pearls Before Swine, and their fourth on Reprise Records.  It was released in 1971.

Like its predecessor City of Gold, the album was credited to Tom Rapp and Pearls Before Swine, rather than solely in the group's name.  By this time, Rapp was usually recording as, in effect, a solo singer-songwriter, supported by his wife Elisabeth and by session musicians.  However, the move towards presenting Rapp as a solo artist happened at the same time as the group Pearls Before Swine - which, since its formation in 1965, had never previously appeared live - was beginning its first concert tour in 1971.  The other members of the 1971 touring band - Mike Krawitz (piano), Gordon Hayes (bass) and Jon Tooker (guitar) - all played on Beautiful Lies, but were not specifically differentiated as band members from the session musicians.  The sessions took place in New York and Woodstock, presumably in early 1971, and featured musicians of the calibre of Amos Garrett (guitar), Bob Dorough (piano), and Billy Mundi (drums).

The album has a more orthodox folk rock (or country rock) sound than earlier Pearls Before Swine records, with electric guitars and drums more prominent.  It also contains several of Tom Rapp's most beautiful and evocative songs, such as "Snow Queen", "Island Lady", and "Freedom", together with a cover of Leonard Cohen's "Bird On A Wire".  The album concludes with a brief setting of A. E. Housman's poem, "Epitaph on an Army of Mercenaries", sung by Elisabeth.

Reverting to the group's practice of using classic art images on their album covers, the sleeve design shows the 19th century Pre-Raphaelite painting "Ophelia" by John Everett Millais.

Beautiful Lies was in effect the last album recorded by Rapp for the Reprise label, although a further album, Familiar Songs, was issued by the company without Rapp's knowledge or approval.  Beautiful Lies was issued on CD in 2003 as part of the Jewels Were the Stars compendium of Pearls Before Swine's first four Reprise albums.

Track listing 
 "Snow Queen" - 4:00 (Rapp)
 "A Life" - 2:57 (Rapp)
 "Butterflies" - 2:46 (Rapp)
 "Simple Things" - 2:55 (Rapp)
 "Everybody's Got Pain" - 2:47 (Rapp)
 "Bird On A Wire" - 3:33 (Cohen)
 "Island Lady" - 4:01 (Rapp)
 "Come To Me" - 2:57 (Rapp)
 "Freedom" - 3:03 (Rapp)
 "She's Gone" - 2:11 (Rapp)
 "Epitaph" - 1:24 (Housman / Elisabeth Rapp)

Performers 
 Tom Rapp: Vocals, Guitar
 Morrie E. Brown: Bass
 Steve Alan Grable: Piano, Organ
 Jon Tooker: Guitar
 Elisabeth (Rapp): Vocals
 Gordon Hayes: Bass
 Michael Krawitz: Piano
 Billy Mundi: Drums
 Bob Dorough: Piano
 Stu Scharf: Electric guitar
 Grady Tate: Drums
 Amos Garrett: Electric guitar
 Herb Lovell: Drums
 Gerry Jermott: Bass

Other credits 
 Produced by Peter H. Edmiston
 Executive Producer : Charles R. Rothschild
 Recorded at A&R Studios, New York; Aura Sound, New York; and Bearsville Studios, Woodstock
 Engineered by Mark Harman

References

External links 
 Lyrics to Beautiful Lies
 [ AMG review]
 Official site for Tom Rapp and Pearls Before Swine
 Fan site on MySpace

Pearls Before Swine (band) albums
1971 albums
Reprise Records albums